Kyparissia may refer to several places and jurisdictions in Greece :

 Kyparissia, a town in Messenia (Peloponnese)
 Kyparissia, Arcadia, a town, former bishopric and Latin Catholic titular see in Arcadia (Peloponnese) 
 Cyparissia (Laconia), an ancient city in Laconia (Peloponnese)
 Gulf of Kyparissia, western Peleponnese

See also 
 Kyparissi, Grevena, a village near Grevena, West Macedonia
 Kyparissi, Laconia, a village in Laconia (Peloponnese)
 Kyparissi, Phtiotis, a village in Phtiotis